The Fish Creek Range is a mountain range in Eureka County, Nevada.

The range was so named on account of nearby streams well-stocked with fish.

References 

Mountain ranges of Nevada
Mountain ranges of Eureka County, Nevada